Anna Cantalupo (born 1939), stage name Aura D'Angelo, is an Italian popular singer of the 1960s. In 1972 she received the Vulture d'oro prize at Melfi.

Career 
Her highest placing was eighth.

In 1972 she received the Vulture d'oro prize at Melfi.

Discography

Singles 
 1960 – "Musicalità/Sere in grigio" (Carosello, CI 20004)
 1960 – "Sempre no/Se nel cielo" (Carosello, CI 20005)
 1961 – "Notturno senza luna/Mandolino... Mandolino..." (Carosello, CI 20016)
 1961 – "Al di là/Febbre di musica" (Carosello, CI 20017)
 1961 – "La maschietta futurista/Ballata del pover uomo" (Carosello, CI 20018)
 1961 – "E la vita continua/Il sole non-tramonta" (Carosello, CI 20021)
 1961 – "Nulla rimpiangerò/Noi innamorati" (Carosello, CI 20031)
 1961 – "Eterno ammore/Si nun se chiamma ammore" (Carosello, CI 20038)
 1961 – "Una canzone per l'estate/Mi sento tua" (Carosello, CI 20047)
 1961 – "Ton adieu/Ancora" (Carosello, CI 20048)
 1962 – "Fantastico amore/Ponte verso il sole" (Carosello, CI 20056)
 1962 – "Quando il vento d'aprile/Addio... Addio..." (Carosello, CI 20057)
 1962 – "Baciami a Capri/Sbruffon twist" (Carosello, CI 20073)
 1962 – "Scugliera/Sbruffon twist" (Carosello, CI 20074)
 1963 – "Tu venisti dal mare/Violino tzigano" (Carosello, CI 20082)
 1963 – "Cambiati la faccia/Nulla rimpiangerò" (Carosello, CI 20086)
 1964 – "Forza Lazio/Una risposta" (Carosello, CI 20115)
 1964 – "... E si nun fosse overo...?/Teneramente" (Carosello, CI 20133)
 1967 – "La città triste/Oggi con te domani chissà" (Durium, CNA 9189)
 1967 – "Non mi devi niente/Ma come posso amare te!" (Durium, CNA 9217)
 1967 – "Sola più che mai/Non mi devi niente" (Durium)
 1968 – "Questa è la verità/La ricchezza" (Durium, Ld A 7589)
 1972 – "Il libro dell'amore/Piccola follia" (Napoleon, NP 1012)
 1980 – "Meglio ridere/E tu lo chiami amore" (C&M, PN 053)
 1982 – "L'Allegria/L'estae" (C&M, ZBCM 7277)
 1987 – "Prima/Donne così" (artist center, CNE 011)
 1992 – "Rionda/Malinconia" (Pinciana, PMX 2070)

Albums 
 1973 – Dammi un bacio e ti dico di si (Cinevox, SC 33/16)
 1981 – Periferia (C&M, PNQ 074)
 1998 – Aura D'Angelo canta Fabor (Ring) – songs of Fabio Fabor
 2008 – Le indimenticabili (Ring)
 2008 – Dal mondo... con Genova nel cuore (De Ferrari & Devega) – songs in Genoa dialect

References

External links 
 D'Angelo at UK-charts

1936 births
Living people
20th-century Italian women singers
21st-century Italian women singers